Cristabatis is an extinct genus of rays that lived during the Early Jurassic. It contains two valid species, C. exundans and C. crescentiformis, which have been found in Belgium and France. It was originally referred to the family "Archaeobatidae", but was later reassigned to the family Toarcibatidae.

References

Ray genera
Early Jurassic life of Europe
Prehistoric cartilaginous fish genera